The United States elevated to Glory and Honor is a book by Ezra Stiles, published in 1783.

Synopsis 
The book is a transcript of a sermon given to the Connecticut General Assembly, on May 8, 1783. At the time, Stiles was the President of Yale College.

The sermon draws parallels between the United States and the Biblical nation of Israel. Stiles refers to the US as an "American Israel, high above all nations which He hath made, in numbers, and in praise, and in name, and in honor", suggesting that the White Americans are like the Chosen People of Israel. He opined that "in God’s good providence" Indians and Africans "may gradually vanish".

See also

 Ezra Stiles
 Haim Isaac Carigal
 Jacob's Pillow-Pillar Stone
 Stone of Scone
 British Israelism
 Lost Ten Tribes

External links
 extracted pages and commentary
  The United States Elevated to Glory and Honor (1783)  online full text (pdf)

1783 non-fiction books
British Israelism
White supremacy in the United States
Books about the United States
Sermons
Anti-indigenous racism in the United States
Anti-black racism in the United States